The Grad AR is a South Ossetian Assault Rifle based on the AK-74, but in a bullpup configuration.

See also
AK-74
OTs-14
FAMAS
QBZ-95
TAR-21
List of assault rifles

References

Assault rifles